The M Countdown Chart is a record chart on the South Korean Mnet television music program M Countdown. Every week, the show awards the best-performing single on the chart in the country during its live broadcast.

In 2014, 28 singles ranked number one on the chart and 27 music acts were awarded first-place trophies. Six songs collected trophies for three weeks and achieved a triple crown: "Miracles in December" by Exo, "Something" by TVXQ, "200%" by AKMU, "Eyes, Nose, Lips" by Taeyang, "Empty" by Winner, and "Happen Ending" by Epik High. Of all releases for the year, only one song earned a perfect score of 10,000 points: "Mr.Mr." by Girls' Generation.

Scoring system

30 August 2012 – 20 February 2014 
Digital Single Sales 50%, Album Sales 10%, Age Preference 20%, Global Fan Vote 5%, Live Show Preferences 10%, SMS Vote 5%

27 February 2014 – 4 June 2015 
Digital Single Sales 50%, Album Sales 10%, Social Media Points (YouTube official music video views + SNS buzz) 10%, Preference Points (global fan votes + age range preference) 10%, Mnet Broadcast Points 10%, SMS Votes 10%

Chart history

References 

2014 in South Korean music
2014 record charts
Lists of number-one songs in South Korea